This is a list of music-related events in 1804.

Events
January 1 – Johann Nepomuk Hummel's Concerto for trumpet and orchestra receives its première in Vienna, in the presence of Nicholas II, Prince Esterházy.
January 23 – François-Adrien Boieldieu becomes musical director at the court of Tsar Alexander I of Russia.
February 20 – Giovanni Paisiello is appointed Maestro di Cappella at Naples.
April 22 – Twelve-year-old Gioachino Rossini gives a concert at Imola.
May 8 – Seventeen-year-old Carl Maria von Weber becomes Kapellmeister at Breslau in Silesia.
May 14 – Napoleon proclaims himself emperor, causing Beethoven to tear up the title page of his recently completed Symphony No. 3 and rename it the Eroica.
September 18 – Composer Muzio Clementi marries 19-year-old pianist Caroline Lehmann, the daughter of Johann Georg Lehmann, director of the Royal Opera, Berlin.  There is a 33-year age gap between bride and groom.
Nicolas Dalayrac is awarded the Légion d'honneur.

Classical music
Ludwig van Beethoven
Piano Sonata No. 22 in F major
Piano Sonata No. 23, Op.57
Symphony No. 2 (published; composed 1801–02)
Triple Concerto, Op.56
Gedenke mein!, WoO 130
Isabella Colbran – Cavatina di partenza
Jan Ladislav Dussek – Fantasia and Fugue for piano 
Anton Eberl – Symphony in D minor, Op. 34
Johann Nepomuk Hummel 
Rondo in E-flat major, Op. 11
Variations for piano Op. 15
Rondo-Fantasie, Op. 19
Mass in E-flat major, Op. 80
Leopold Kozeluch – Three Piano Sonatas
Niccolo Paganini – Divertimenti Carnevaleschi
Ferdinand Ries – Piano sonata in A minor, Op. 1 No. 2
Gioachino Rossini – 6 Sonate a quattro
Antonio Salieri – Requiem in C minor
Louis Spohr – Concerto for Violin No. 2 in D minor, Op. 2
Carl Maria von Weber 
6 Variations sur l'air de Naga de 'Samori', Op.6
6 Lieder, Op. 30
Turandot, Op.37 (incidental music for Schiller's production)
Joseph Wölfl – Symphony in C major, Op. 41

Opera
Ludwig van Beethoven – Fidelio, Op.72 (composed; premiered 1805)
François-Adrien Boieldieu – Aline, reine de Golconde
Pierre Gaveaux – 
Adalbert Gyrowetz – Selico
Ferdinando Paer – Leonora
Gaspare Spontini – Milton
Georg Joseph Vogler – Samori

Births
January 24 – Delphine de Girardin, lyricist and writer (died 1855)
January 25 – Antoni Edward Odyniec, librettist and writer (died 1885)
February 5 – Johan Ludvig Runeberg, lyricist and poet (died 1877)
March 14 – Johann Strauss I, Austrian composer (d. 1849)
March 30 – Salomon Sulzer, Austrian Jewish composer (d. 1890)
April 15 – Otto Friedrich Gruppe, lyricist and poet (died 1876)
May 13 – Aleksey Khomyakov, lyricist and philosopher (died 1860)
May 31 – Louise Farrenc, born Jeanne-Louise Dumont, French pianist and composer (d. 1875)
June 1 – Mikhail Glinka, Russian composer (d. 1857)
June 13 – Gustave de Wailly, librettist and writer (died 1878)
June 21 – Johann Gabriel Seidl, librettist and archeologist (died 1875)
July 14 – Julius Schuberth, German author and publisher, founder of Schuberth & Co. (d. 1875)
July 17 – Carl Ferdinand Becker, music collector and musician (died 1877)
August 19 – Christina Enbom, Swedish operatic soprano (d. 1880)
September 8 – Eduard Mörike, lyricist and poet (died 1875)
October 1 – Eduard Sobolewski, Polish-American violinist, composer and conductor (may have been born in 1808; d. 1872) 
October 18 
Alexandre Charles Fessy, composer and musician (died 1856)
Joseph-Bernard Rosier, librettist and playwright (died 1880)
November 27 – Sir Julius Benedict, German-born conductor and composer (d. 1885)
date unknown – Ferdinand Giovanni Schediwy, Czech-born organist, conductor and composer (d. 1877)

Deaths
March 29 (or 30) – Ivan Khandoshkin, violinist and composer (b. 1747)
June 16 – Johann Adam Hiller, conductor, composer and music writer (b. 1728)
July 17 – Christian Ernst Graf, composer and kapellmeister (born 1723)
August 24 – Valentin Adamberger, operatic tenor (b. 1740)
November 5 – Maria Anna Adamberger, actress and singer, wife of Valentin Adamberger (b. 1752)
November 19 – Pietro Guglielmi, composer (b. 1728)
date unknown
Gioacchino Cocchi, opera composer (b.c.1720)
Marie Louise Marcadet, actress and singer (b. 1758)
Lorenzo Quaglio, stage designer (b. 1730)
Giovanni Valentini, composer, poet and painter (b. c. 1730)
Christian Felix Weisse, lyricist and writer (born 1726)
Abraham Wood, early American composer (b. 1752)

References

 
19th century in music
Music by year